José Antonio Naya Mella (born 30 April 1934) is a Spanish former football manager.

Football career
Naya was born in A Coruña, Galicia, and played youth football for Deportivo de La Coruña before joining the military service. After obtaining the coaching qualifications he became a manager, taking over lowly sides Júpiter Leonés, Cultural y Deportiva Leonesa, SD Hullera Vasco-Leonesa, RSD Alcalá and CD Toledo.

In 1972, after winning the amateur championship with Real Madrid Aficionados, Naya was appointed manager of Cádiz CF in Segunda División. After narrowly avoiding relegation, he was named in charge of Tercera División side Getafe Deportivo in November of that year, as the side only won one point in their first ten matches; he took the club to a mid-table finish before moving to CD Ourense in the second division in December 1973.

Naya subsequently worked at Burgos CF, Deportivo, Real Murcia (two stints), Levante UD, Recreativo de Huelva, Linares CF, CD Castellón, Deportivo Alavés, Granada CF, Xerez CD, Real Burgos CF, CE Sabadell FC, Cádiz and Ourense. With Real Burgos he won the second division in 1989–90, but was subsequently replaced by Novoa.

Honours
Levante
Segunda División B: 1978–79

Real Burgos
Segunda División: 1989–90

References

External links

1934 births
Living people
Sportspeople from A Coruña
Spanish football managers
Segunda División managers
Segunda División B managers
Tercera División managers
Cultural Leonesa managers
RSD Alcalá managers
CD Toledo managers
Real Madrid C managers
Cádiz CF managers
CD Ourense managers
Burgos CF (1936) managers
Deportivo de La Coruña managers
Real Murcia managers
Levante UD managers
Recreativo de Huelva managers
CD Castellón managers
Deportivo Alavés managers
Granada CF managers
Xerez CD managers
Real Burgos CF managers
CE Sabadell FC managers